Janine Merrey was a French film actress. She appeared in more than thirty films.

Selected filmography
 Love Songs (1930)
 The Regiment's Champion (1932)
 If You Wish It (1932)
 A Father Without Knowing It (1932)
 The Uncle from Peking (1934)
 Princess Tarakanova (1938)
 His Uncle from Normandy (1939)

References

Bibliography
 Goble, Alan. The Complete Index to Literary Sources in Film. Walter de Gruyter, 1999.

External links

Year of birth missing
Year of death missing
People from Bois-Colombes
French film actresses
French silent film actresses
20th-century French actresses